The 2012 European Trophy was the third European Trophy, a European ice hockey tournament held annually. It is also the seventh tournament since its predecessor, the Nordic Trophy, was launched in 2006. The regulation round started on 31 July 2012 with the South Division game between Piráti Chomutov–Slovan Bratislava, and will end on 28 November 2012. The playoffs will be played between 13 and 16 December 2012 in Vienna and in Bratislava. The preliminary schedule for the regulation round was released on 12 April 2012.

In this year's tournament the number of participating teams was increased from 24 to 32. Also, as Red Bull Salzburg no longer hosted the playoffs for the first time in European Trophy history, they weren't guaranteed a playoff spot. Of the 128 regular round games, 20 were played mid-season (i.e. after teams had started their league seasons in their respective countries). Regarding the playoffs, there were only Quarterfinals, Semifinals as well as the Final game, meaning that the losing teams in each round were immediately eliminated from the tournament.

On 31 May 2012, Slavia Praha announced that they were pulling out of the tournament. On 18 June it was announced that Piráti Chomutov would take over Slavia Praha's spot in the South Division.

Tournament format 
The 32 teams in the tournament are, partly based on geographical location, divided into four divisions: the West Division, the North Division, the South Division, and the East Division. Each division consists of 8 teams who will play a round-robin in their division, with an extra game against a local rival in their division, giving a total of 8 games per team. Each team is assigned four home games as well as four road games. The top two teams of each division qualify for the playoffs; however, should Slovan Bratislava and/or Vienna Capitals qualify for the playoffs as hosts (if they fail to reach one of the top two spots of the South Division), they will replace the worst second ranked team(s) out of all four divisions.

Should at least two teams in the same division (or second-ranked teams) end up tied in points, the following tie-breaker format will be used:
Best goal difference
Most goals scored in total (goals forward)
Results in games against the tied teams
Drawing of lots

This tie-breaker format will also apply when determining which second-ranked team(s) to be replaced if the host teams Slovan Bratislava and/or Vienna Capitals fail to reach the playoffs by finishing top two in the South Division.

Playing format 
If a game is tied after regulation time (60 minutes), an overtime lasting for 5 minutes is played. During overtime, both teams substitute only 4 players on the ice at once (except for 3 when either of the teams has a penalized player). If no team scores during the overtime period, a shootout is played, starting with three penalty shots for both teams. If the shootout remains tied after the first three rounds, sudden death rounds are played until a winning team has been forced.

In the regulation round games, the teams get three points for a regulation-time victory, two points for an overtime/shootout win, one point for losing in overtime/shootout, and zero points for a regulation loss.

Prize money 
After the regulation round, the four division winners received €25 000 each, the four second-placed teams €20 000, and the third, fourth and fifth team of each division received €15 000, €10 000, and €5 000, respectively. Additionally, in the final of the Red Bulls Salute, the winning team received €50 000, while the losing finalist got €10 000. In total, €360 000 was given out during the entire tournament.

Participating clubs 

Note (*): the stated home arenas don't have to be used in the European Trophy tournament.
Note (**): SC Bern and ZSC Lions did not participate in 2011.
Note (***): Slavia Praha pulled out of the tournament just two months before the first games are to be played. Piráti Chomutov are replacing Slavia Praha.

Rivalries 
West Division
Jokerit vs. HIFK
Frölunda Indians vs. Färjestad BK
Adler Mannheim vs. ERC Ingolstadt
ZSC Lions vs. EV Zug
North Division
Luleå HF vs. Oulun Kärpät
Hamburg Freezers vs. Eisbären Berlin
Kometa Brno vs. Plzeň 1929
České Budějovice vs. Red Bull Salzburg
South Division
KalPa vs. JYP
Linköpings HC vs. HV71
Piráti Chomutov vs. Sparta Praha
Vienna Capitals vs. Slovan Bratislava
East Division
Tappara vs. TPS
Brynäs IF vs. Djurgårdens IF
Bílí Tygři Liberec vs. Pojišťovna Pardubice
SC Bern vs. Fribourg-Gottéron

Regulation round

West Division 

Games in Finland are UTC+3, while all other games are UTC+2, except the 28 October game which is UTC+1.

North Division 

Games in Finland are UTC+3, while all other games are UTC+2, except the  November games which are UTC+1.

South Division 

Games in Finland are UTC+3, while all other games are UTC+2, except the November game which is UTC+1.

East Division 

Games in Finland are UTC+3, while all other games are UTC+2, except the November games which are UTC+1.

Playoff team seeds 

Playoff hosts Slovan Bratislava and Vienna Capitals qualify automatically. Four division-winners qualify. After this, best-scoring division-runners-up qualify to bring the number to exactly eight.

Winners of divisions:
 West: Färjestad BK
 North: Luleå HF
 South: HV71
 East: Tappara

Runners-up of divisions:

Playoffs 

The playoffs, known as the Red Bulls Salute, will take place in the Albert Schultz Eishalle, Vienna and in the Slovnaft Arena, Bratislava between 13 and 16 December 2012, with the Final game taking place in Slovnaft Arena. It will be played as a single-elimination tournament, meaning that the losing teams in each round are eliminated from the tournament. For the first time in Red Bulls Salute history, no classification/placement games will be played, so there will only be Quarterfinals, Semifinals as well as the Final game. The winner of the Red Bulls Salute will be awarded a total prize sum of €50 000, and the losing finalist receives €10 000.

Bracket 
The non-home teams will be seeded according to their score in the regulation round.

Quarterfinals 
All times are local (UTC+1).

The quarterfinal matchups will be determined by the regulation-round record of the six playoff teams aside from the two automatically qualified hosts Slovan Bratislava and Vienna Capitals. The top-ranked team of these six teams will face the sixth-ranked team; the second-ranked team will face the fifth-ranked team; the third-ranked team will face Vienna Capitals; and the fourth-ranked team will face Slovan Bratislava.

Semifinals 
All times are local (UTC+1).

For quarterfinal numbering, see the bracket above.

Final 

Time is local (UTC+1).

Ranking and statistics

Tournament awards

Final standings 
The following is the final standings of the playoffs. However, note that because there weren't any classification/placement games in this year's playoffs, the standings for the six teams that missed the Final game were ranked on the following criteria: A. whether the team made it to the Semifinal or not, and B. the team's regulation round record.

Scoring leaders 
List shows the top skaters sorted by points, then goals. If the list exceeds 10 skaters because of a tie in points, all of the tied skaters are shown.
GP = Games played; G = Goals; A = Assists; Pts = Points; PIM = Penalties in minutes; POS = Position  positions: F = Forward; D = DefencemanSources: Europeantrophy.com and Eurohockey.com Updated as of 19 August 2012.

Leading goaltenders 
Only the top five goaltenders, based on save percentage, who have played 40% of their team's minutes, are included in this list.
TOI = Time on ice (minutes:seconds); SA = Shots against; GA = Goals against; GAA = Goals against average; Sv% = Save percentage; SO = ShutoutsSources: Europeantrophy.com and Eurohockey.com Updated as of 19 August 2012.

European Star Award leaders
The European Star Award is a three stars award given to the three best players in each game. The first star gets three points, the second gets two points, and the third gets one point. List shows the top ten players based on the number of European Star Award points.
GP = Games played; Pts = Points; POS = Position  positions: G = Goaltender; F = Forward; D = DefencemanSource: Europeantrophy.com Updated as of 19 August 2012.

References 

 
1
European Trophy